The 5th Supreme People's Assembly (SPA) was elected on 12 December 1972 and convened for its first session on 25–28 December 1972. It was replaced on 17 December 1977 by the 6th Supreme People's Assembly.

Meetings

Officers

Chairman

Vice Chairman

Deputies

References

Citations

Bibliography
Books:
 
  
 

5th Supreme People's Assembly
1972 establishments in North Korea
1977 disestablishments in North Korea